Beihan Airport  is an airport serving Beihan, a city in the Shabwah Governorate in Yemen.

Facilities

References

External links
 

Airports in Yemen
Shabwah Governorate